St Patrick's is a Gaelic Athletic Association club based in Dromard and Skreen in west County Sligo, Republic of Ireland.

Ballaghaderreen midfielder and former championship player for Mayo James Kilcullen declared for Sligo shortly after his club won the 2012 Mayo Senior Football Championship by virtue of St Patrick's being his parents' first club.

The club's most famous player is Mickey Kearins, who made his senior inter-county debut in 1961 and won seven Sligo Senior Football Championship medals with St Pat's.

Notable players
James Kearins, brother of Mickey Kearins, won a Connacht Senior Football Championship medal as a Sligo player in 1975, was appointed manager in 2003
Mickey Kearins – All Star: 1971

Honours

 Sligo Senior Football Championship: (7)
 1968, 1970, 1971, 1973, 1974, 1988, 1989
 Sligo Intermediate Football Championship: (1)
 2002
 Sligo Junior Football Championship: (4)
 1964, 1967, 2010, 2021
 Sligo Senior Football League (Division 1): (6)
 1970, 1972, 1975, 1976, 1980, 1985
 Sligo Intermediate Football League Division 3 (ex Div. 2): (2)
 1993, 2010
 Sligo Junior Football League (Division 5): (1)
 2011
 Kiernan Cup: (4)
 1981, 1982, 1985, 1991

References

Gaelic games clubs in County Sligo